Praščevac is a village in Croatia. It is connected by the Ž2231 road with Farkaševac and Cirkvena.

References

Populated places in Zagreb County